Esmailabad (also Romanized as Esmā‘īlābād; also known as Isma‘īlābād) is a village in Kavir Rural District, Deyhuk District, Tabas County, South Khorasan Province, Iran. At the 2006 census, its population was 187, in 58 families.

References 

Populated places in Tabas County